Lilja Guðmundsdóttir (born 3 January 1955) is an Icelandic middle-distance runner. She competed in the women's 800 metres at the 1976 Summer Olympics.

References

1955 births
Living people
Athletes (track and field) at the 1976 Summer Olympics
Lilja Gudmundsdottir
Lilja Gudmundsdottir
Place of birth missing (living people)